Samuel Leland Montague (May 4, 1829 – January 16, 1897) was a Massachusetts politician who served on the Common Council, the Board of Aldermen and as the Mayor of Cambridge, Massachusetts.

Personal life
Montague was born in Montague, Massachusetts on May 4, 1829, to Simeon and Sybil (Leland) Montague. He married Ann Maria Bucksted on December 23, 1853, who died less than a year later on September 12, 1854. After her death, he married Mary Elizabeth Bucksted. They had two children, Charles H. and Annie S. Montague.

Notes

Mayors of Cambridge, Massachusetts
Cambridge, Massachusetts City Council members
1829 births
1869 deaths
Massachusetts Republicans
19th-century American politicians
People from Montague, Massachusetts